Albers is a village in Clinton County, Illinois, United States. The population was 1,121 at the 2020 census.

History
Albers had its start in the 1860s when the railroad was extended to that point.

Geography
Albers is located in western Clinton County. Illinois Route 161 runs through the village, leading east  to Centralia and west  to Interstate 64, which leads  farther west to St. Louis.

Demographics

As of the 2020 census there were 1,121 people, 508 households, and 407 families residing in the village. The racial makeup of the village was 93.22% White, 0.09% African American, 0.27% Asian, 2.85% from other races, and 3.57% from two or more races. Hispanic or Latino of any race were 4.91% of the population.

There were 508 households, out of which 68.70% had children under the age of 18 living with them, 72.05% were married couples living together, 5.71% had a female householder with no husband present, and 19.88% were non-families. 15.75% of all households were made up of individuals, and 9.25% had someone living alone who was 65 years of age or older. The average household size was 3.01 and the average family size was 2.71.

The village's age distribution consisted of 28.3% under the age of 18, 4.9% from 18 to 24, 25.7% from 25 to 44, 21% from 45 to 64, and 20.2% who were 65 years of age or older. The median age was 40.5 years. For every 100 females, there were 110.2 males. For every 100 females age 18 and over, there were 96.6 males.

The median income for a household in the village was $94,375, and the median income for a family was $99,441. Males had a median income of $44,412 versus $40,758 for females. The per capita income for the village was $34,104. About 15.0% of families and 13.7% of the population were below the poverty line, including 25.5% of those under age 18 and 1.8% of those age 65 or over.

Education
 Central Community High School - Formed as a consolidation of the Breese and Aviston high schools in 1971

References

External links
 Village of Albers former official website
 Village's current official website

Villages in Clinton County, Illinois
Populated places established in 1891
1891 establishments in Illinois